USS Turbot (SS-427), a Balao-class submarine, was the second ship of the United States Navy to be named for the turbot, a large, brown and white flatfish, valued as a food.

Turbots keel was laid down on 13 November 1943 at Philadelphia, Pennsylvania, by the Cramp Shipbuilding Company, but the contract for her construction was cancelled on 12 August 1945. Her partially completed hulk was launched on 12 April 1946 and, in 1950, was assigned to the Naval Ship Research and Development Center at Annapolis, Maryland, where it was used for research and development in connection with the control and reduction of machinery noise in submarines.

Turbot was stricken from the Naval Vessel Register in 1958, and sold for scrapping to the Bethlehem Steel Corporation, at Sparrow's Point, Maryland; however, rather than being scrapped, she remained tied up to a U.S. Navy pier in Carr's Creek at the North Severn Naval Station in Maryland, where she continued to be used for testing well into the 1980s. Some material was removed from her hulk for use in other submarines, including her six torpedo air flasks, which were installed in the submarine  in San Francisco, California.

References 

 

 

Turbot
Cancelled ships of the United States Navy
Ships built by William Cramp & Sons
1946 ships